Xenon difluoride is a powerful fluorinating agent with the chemical formula , and one of the most stable xenon compounds. Like most covalent inorganic fluorides it is moisture-sensitive. It decomposes on contact with water vapor, but is otherwise stable in storage.  Xenon difluoride is a dense, colourless crystalline solid.

It has a nauseating odour and low vapor pressure.

Structure

The packing arrangement in solid  shows that the fluorine atoms of neighbouring molecules avoid the equatorial region of each  molecule. This agrees with the prediction of VSEPR theory, which predicts that there are 3 pairs of non-bonding electrons around the equatorial region of the xenon atom.

At high pressures, novel, non-molecular forms of xenon difluoride can be obtained. Under a pressure of ~50 GPa,  transforms into a semiconductor consisting of  units linked in a two-dimensional structure, like graphite. At even higher pressures, above 70 GPa, it becomes metallic, forming a three-dimensional structure containing  units. However, a recent theoretical study has cast doubt on these experimental results.

The Xe–F bonds are weak. However, XeF2 is much more robust than KrF2, which has a total bond energy of only .

Chemistry

Synthesis
Synthesis proceeds by the simple reaction:

Xe + F2 → XeF2

The reaction needs heat, irradiation, or an electrical discharge. The product is a solid.  It is purified by fractional distillation or selective condensation using a vacuum line.

The first published report of XeF2 was in October 1962 by Chernick, et al.  However, though published later,  XeF2 was probably first created by Rudolf Hoppe at the University of Münster, Germany, in early 1962, by reacting fluorine and xenon gas mixtures in an electrical discharge. Shortly after these reports, Weeks, Cherwick, and Matheson of Argonne National Laboratory reported the synthesis of XeF2 using an all-nickel system with transparent alumina windows, in which equal parts xenon and fluorine gases react at low pressure upon irradiation by an ultraviolet source to give XeF2.  Williamson reported that the reaction works equally well at atmospheric pressure in a dry Pyrex glass bulb using sunlight as a source. It was noted that the synthesis worked even on cloudy days.

In the previous syntheses the fluorine gas reactant had been purified to remove hydrogen fluoride.  Šmalc and Lutar found that if this step is skipped the reaction rate proceeds at four times the original rate.

In 1965, it was also synthesized by reacting xenon gas with dioxygen difluoride.

Solubility

Solubility in hydrogen fluoride is high, at 167 g per 100 g HF at 29.95 °C.

Derived xenon compounds

Other xenon compounds may be derived from xenon difluoride. The resulting waxy white solid decomposes completely within 4 hours at room temperature.

The XeF+ cation is formed by combining xenon difluoride with a strong fluoride acceptor, such as an excess of liquid antimony pentafluoride:

  +  →  + 

Adding xenon gas to this pale yellow solution at a pressure of 2–3 atmospheres produces a green solution containing the paramagnetic  ion, which contains a Xe−Xe bond: ("apf" denotes solution in liquid )

 3 Xe(g) + (apf) + (l)  2 (apf) + (apf)

In the presence of liquid HF, dark green crystals can be precipitated from the green solution at −30 °C:

 (apf) + 4 (apf) → (s) + 3 (apf)

X-ray crystallography indicates that the Xe–Xe bond length in this compound is 309 pm, indicating a very weak bond. The  ion is isoelectronic with the  ion, which is also dark green.

Coordination chemistry
Bonding in the XeF2 molecule is adequately described by the three-center four-electron bond model.

XeF2 can act as a ligand in coordination complexes of metals. For example, in HF solution:

Mg(AsF6)2 + 4 XeF2 → [Mg(XeF2)4](AsF6)2

Crystallographic analysis shows that the magnesium atom is coordinated to 6 fluorine atoms. Four of the fluorine atoms are attributed to the four xenon difluoride ligands while the other two are a pair of cis- ligands.

A similar reaction is:

Mg(AsF6)2 + 2 XeF2 → [Mg(XeF2)2](AsF6)2

In the crystal structure of this product the magnesium atom is octahedrally-coordinated and the XeF2 ligands are axial while the  ligands are equatorial.

Many such reactions with products of the form [Mx(XeF2)n](AF6)x have been observed, where M can be calcium, strontium, barium, lead, silver, lanthanum, or neodymium and A can be arsenic, antimony or phosphorus.

In 2004, results of synthesis of a solvate where part of cationic centers were coordinated solely by XeF2 fluorine atoms were published. Reaction can be written as:

2 Ca(AsF6)2 + 9 XeF2 → Ca2(XeF2)9(AsF6)4.

This reaction requires a large excess of xenon difluoride.

Applications

As a fluorinating agent
Xenon difluoride is a strong fluorinating and oxidizing agent. With fluoride ion acceptors, it forms  and  species which are even more powerful fluorinators.

Among the fluorination reactions that xenon difluoride undergoes are:

 Oxidative fluorination:
Ph3TeF + XeF2 → Ph3TeF3 + Xe
 Reductive fluorination:
2 CrO2F2 + XeF2 → 2 CrOF3 + Xe +O2
 Aromatic fluorination:

 Alkene fluorination:

 Radical fluorination in radical decarboxylative fluorination reactions, in Hunsdiecker-type reactions where xenon difluoride is used to generate the radical intermediate as well as the fluorine transfer source, and in generating aryl radicals from aryl silanes:

 is selective about which atom it fluorinates, making it a useful reagent for fluorinating heteroatoms without touching other substituents in organic compounds. For example, it fluorinates the arsenic atom in trimethylarsine, but leaves the methyl groups untouched:

 +  →  + Xe

XeF2 can similarly be used to prepare N-fluoroammonium salts, useful as fluorine transfer reagents in organic synthesis (e.g., Selectfluor), from the corresponding tertiary amine:

[R–(CH2CH2)3N:][] + XeF2 + NaBF4 → [R–(CH2CH2)3–F][]2 + NaF + Xe

 will also oxidatively decarboxylate carboxylic acids to the corresponding fluoroalkanes:

RCOOH  +  XeF2  → RF  +  CO2  +  Xe  +  HF

As an etchant

Xenon difluoride is also used as an isotropic gaseous etchant for silicon, particularly in the production of microelectromechanical systems (MEMS), as first demonstrated in 1995.  Commercial systems use pulse etching with an expansion chamber
Brazzle, Dokmeci, et al. describe this process:

The mechanism of the etch is as follows. First, the XeF2 adsorbs and dissociates to xenon and fluorine atoms on the surface of silicon. Fluorine is the main etchant in the silicon etching process. The reaction describing the silicon with XeF2 is
2 XeF2 + Si → 2 Xe + SiF4
XeF2 has a relatively high etch rate and does not require ion bombardment or external energy sources in order to etch silicon.

References

Further reading

External links
 WebBook page for XeF2

Xenon(II) compounds
Fluorides
Nonmetal halides
Fluorinating agents